The decade of the 1210s in art involved some significant events.

Events

Art
 1210: Iraqi painter – Two Galloping Horsemen

 1212: Unkei sculpts Miroku Bosatsu in Kōfuku-ji
 1216: Kōben sculpts statues of Tentōki and Ryūtōki, who carry lanterns as offering to the Historical Buddha at Kōfuku-ji

Births
 1215: Bonaventura Berlinghieri – Italian painter of the Gothic period (died 1242)
 1213: Jacopo Cosmati – Roman architect and sculptor, and worker in decorative geometric mosaic (died 1293)
 1213: Lanxi Daolong – Chinese Buddhist monk, calligrapher and philosopher (died 1278)
 1210: Muqi Fachang – Chinese Zen Buddhist monk and renowned painter (died 1269)
 1210: Mu Xi – Chinese landscape painter during the Song Dynasty (died 1270)
 1210: Cosimo Cosmati – Roman architect and sculptor, and worker in decorative geometric mosaic (died 1235)

Deaths
 1210: Liang Kai – Chinese painter, also known as Madman Liang, (born 1140)

 
Years of the 13th century in art
Art